The southern fin whale (Balaenoptera physalus quoyi) is a subspecies of fin whale that lives in the Southern Ocean.   At least one other subspecies of fin whale, the northern fin whale (B. p. physalus), exists in the northern hemisphere.

Taxonomy

Based on differences in the vertebrae, the Swedish zoologist Einar Lönnberg (1931) designated Balaenoptera physalus quoyii (later the Russian scientist A.G. Tomilin (1957) corrected this to B. p. quoyi). B. p. quoyi in turn is based on Balaena quoyi (Fischer, 1829), which was the name given to a  specimen seen on the shores of the Falkland Islands by Monsieur Quoy and originally named Balaena rostrata australis by Desmoulins (1822).

Size

Southern fin whales are larger than their northern hemisphere counterparts, with males averaging  and females . At sexual maturity, males average  and females .

Reproduction
Because of the opposing seasons in each hemisphere, B. p. quoyi breeds at a different time of the year than B. p. physalus. Peak conception for B. p. quoyi is June–July, while peak birthing is in May. Along with the impacts of whaling, slower reproduction rate of the species may affect population recoveries as the total population size is predicted to be at less than 50% of its pre-whaling state by 2100.

References

External links 
 

Baleen whales
Cetaceans of the Indian Ocean
Cetaceans of the Pacific Ocean
Mammals of Asia
Mammals of Oceania
Mammals described in 1829